Bystrovany is a municipality and village in Olomouc District in the Olomouc Region of the Czech Republic. It has about 1,000 inhabitants.

Notable people
Jarmila Šťastná (1932–2015), speed skater and figure skater

References

Villages in Olomouc District